Kongsmo Chapel is a chapel of the Church of Norway in Høylandet municipality in Trøndelag county, Norway. It is located in the village of Kongsmoen in the northern part of the municipality. It is an annex chapel for the Høylandet parish which is part of the Namdal prosti (deanery) in the Diocese of Nidaros. The white, wooden church was built in a long church style in 1937 using plans drawn up by the architect Simon Fuglstad. The church seats about 110 people.

See also
List of churches in Nidaros

References

Høylandet
Churches in Trøndelag
Wooden churches in Norway
20th-century Church of Norway church buildings
Churches completed in 1937
1937 establishments in Norway
Long churches in Norway